USS Moose may refer to the following ships of the United States Navy:

 , was a wooden steam gunboat purchased by the US Navy in 1863 and decommissioned April 1865
 , was commissioned in January 1944 and sold in 1951

See also
 , a destroyer nicknamed the "Moose" by her crew
 

United States Navy ship names